Ole Neumann is a former Danish child actor of the 1950s and 1960s.

Filmography 
Far til fire (1953)
Fløjtespilleren (1953)
Far til fire i sneen (1954)
Far til fire på landet (1955)
Far til fire i byen (1956)
Far til fire og onkel Sofus (1957)
Far til fire og ulveungerne (1958)
Far til fire på Bornholm (1959)
Det skete på Møllegården (1960)
Far til fire med fuld musik (1961)
Kampen om Næsbygård (1964)
Næsbygårds arving (1965)
Krybskytterne på Næsbygård (1966)

References

External links

Danish male film actors
20th-century Danish male actors
Danish male child actors
1947 births
Living people